Jenderata Estate is a large palm oil estate in Bagan Datuk District, Perak, Malaysia. Established in 1906 , it is owned by United Plantations. 

It was the first estate to have a football club enter the professional M-League. Formed as the Jenderata FC in 2004, the team became the UPB-MyTeam FC in 2006.

It has its own small air strip, known as Jendarata Airport. 

Bagan Datuk District
Populated places in Perak
Palm oil production in Malaysia